"If I Wanted To" is a song by American singer-songwriter Melissa Etheridge, released in 1994 as the final single from her fourth studio album, Yes I Am (1993). The song entered the top 50 in Australia, Canada, Iceland, and the United States.

Commercial performance
"If I Wanted To", which was released as a double A-side with "Like the Way I Do" in the United States, debuted on the US Billboard Hot 100 in February 1995 at No. 25, making it the highest-debuting single of 1995 at that point. The single's debut was the highest for any song since Boyz II Men's "On Bended Knee" debuted at No. 14 in November 1994.

"If I Wanted To" peaked at No. 16 on the Billboard Hot 100 in March 1995. Strong singles sales in March 1995 for TLC's "Red Light Special", Real McCoy's "Run Away", and The Notorious B.I.G.'s "Big Poppa" prevented "If I Wanted To" from rising higher on the Hot 100 despite widespread airplay on major US radio stations.

Critical reception
Fred Bronson of Billboard wrote that with the single's debut, "Melissa Etheridge continues to solidify her new status as a chart superstar with the highest-debuting single of 1995." Fell and Rufer from the Gavin Report felt that the song "rocks with the best of her previous winners, but can also stand alone on its own merit, as it builds in intensity without losing its cool." Sam Wood from Philadelphia Inquirer found that with "If I Wanted To" "she describes her own desires with a full palette of harrowing visions that never meander into prettified abstraction".

Music video
The single's accompanying music video was directed by Samuel Bayer.

Track listings
 US and Australian maxi-CD single
 "If I Wanted To" – 3:29
 "Come to My Window" (live) – 3:21
 "Bring Me Some Water" (live) – 4:35
 "Like the Way I Do" (live) – 10:12

 US 7-inch single
A. "If I Wanted To" – 3:29
B. "Come to My Window" – 3:34

 US cassette single
 "If I Wanted To" – 3:29
 "Like the Way I Do" – 5:23

Charts

Weekly charts

Year-end charts

References

1993 songs
1995 singles
Island Records singles
Melissa Etheridge songs
Music videos directed by Samuel Bayer
Song recordings produced by Hugh Padgham
Songs written by Melissa Etheridge